Escherichia coli Nissle 1917 is a strain of Escherichia coli that was isolated from the feces of a German soldier in 1917 by the German researcher Alfred Nissle.  Since that time it has been widely studied as a probiotic and several marketed probiotics include it.

References

Probiotics
Escherichia